The 2008 Utah gubernatorial election was held on November 4, 2008. The deadline to file for the primary was June 24, 2008. Incumbent Republican Governor Jon Huntsman Jr. won re-election in a landslide, defeating Democratic nominee Bob Springmeyer and  Libertarian nominee Dell Schanze.

Candidates

Republican Party
Jon Huntsman, Jr., incumbent Governor

Democratic Party
Bob Springmeyer, businessman

Libertarian Party
Dell Schanze, businessman

General election

Predictions

Polling

Results

References

External links 
Utah State Board of Elections
Utah State Board of Elections – Official Results – 2008 General Election
Utah Governor candidates at Project Vote Smart
Utah Governor race from OurCampaigns.com
Utah Governor race from 2008 Race Tracker
Campaign contributions from Follow the Money
Huntsman (R-i) vs Springmeyer (D) graph of collected poll results from Pollster.com
Official campaign websites (Archived)
Jon Huntsman, Republican incumbent nominee
Bob Springmeyer, Democratic nominee

Utah
Gubernatorial
2008